The S3 was a French land-based Intermediate Range Ballistic Missile, equipped with a single 1.2-megatonne thermonuclear warhead. In France it is called an SSBS, for Sol-Sol Balistique Stratégique, or Ground-Ground Strategic Ballistic Missile.

Design 
The S3 is a two-stage, solid-propellant Intermediate Range Ballistic Missile (IRBM). The first stage was inherited from the S2, with a P16 solid fuel engine and 4 exhausts.

The first stage carries  of fuel and burns for 72 seconds. The second stage carries  and burns for 58 seconds. The nuclear warhead, a single 1.2 Mt TN 61, is hardened and carries penetration aids.

Operational history 
From 1971, the main land-based component of the French nuclear deterrent (force de dissuasion) was the S2 missile. In 1973, a programme was started to develop a second-generation "ground-ground ballistic strategic" (SSBS in French) missile, completed in 1980. Two groups totaling 18 S2 missile silos were upgraded to the S3 standard.

A first 9-missile group was deployed at Apt-Saint-Christol air base, on the Plateau d'Albion in the Vaucluse region, entering service in 1982. The second group followed soon after. 40 missiles were built, 13 being used on trials.

The S3 were originally planned to be replaced around 2005 by a land-based version of the M5, the submarine missile planned at the time. As the M5 project was itself delayed and eventually cancelled in favour of the M51, in 1994, the replacement was rescheduled to be a land-based version of the M45. The 18 S3D missile silos were deactivated in September 1996, and within two years and after an expenditure of US$77.5 million, the silos and related facilities were fully dismantled. They would not be replaced.

References

Intermediate-range ballistic missiles
Ballistic missiles of France
Nuclear missiles of France
Projects established in 1980
1980 in military history
1980s in France
1980 establishments in France
1996 disestablishments in France
Military equipment introduced in the 1980s